Mount Gambier–Heywood railway line is a  line located in Australia which operated from 27 November 1917 to 11 April 1995 between Mount Gambier in the state of South Australia and Heywood in the state of Victoria.  It is one of two railway lines built by both state governments following an agreement in 1912 to connect to each other's railway networks. There has been calls for standardisation over the past two decades from Heywood to Wolseley since the Melbourne to Adelaide line was converted in 1995.

Naming
The line is gazetted as the "Mount Gambier–Heywood Railway" by both the South Australian and Victorian governments. This name was also used in a report jointly published by the two state governments in 2009.

Newspaper reports published in both states about the railway line before its opening used the title "Portland–Mount Gambier Railway." Some sources published in Victoria refer to the line as the "Mount Gambier line."

History
The South Australian and Victorian governments agreed on 28 November 1912 to connect their respective railway networks at two places by constructing lines between Heywood and Mount Gambier and between Murrayville in Victoria and Pinnaroo in South Australia with legislation subsequently passed by both parliaments being enacted on 14 December 1912 and 23 December 1912 respectively.

The agreement between the two state governments gave the responsibility for the construction of the line between Heywood and Mount Gambier to the Government of Victoria and the responsibility for the line between Murrayville and Pinnaroo to the Government of South Australia. The section of line between Heywood and Dartmoor was completed on 22 June 1916 with the remainder of the line being complete on 28 November 1917.

The railway line opened for business on 28 November 1917 without any "special ceremony" and with passenger services scheduled for Mondays, Wednesdays and Fridays.

The rail service between Mount Gambier and Heywood was suspended on 11 April 1995 due to the standardization of the gauges of the Melbourne–Adelaide and the Maroona-Portland lines. The South Australian section of the line between Mount Gambier and Rennick was used by the tourist service, the Limestone Coast Railway, until 20 March 1999.

In 2009, the South Australian and Victorian governments published an action plan for freight services within the Green Triangle Region which advised that projected volumes of woodchip intended for export from the Port of Portland in the years 2012–2015 would make a restored Mount Gambier–Heywood rail line a "potentially … commercially viable" operation. In 2020 the Limestone Coast Regional Development Board conducted a feasibility study with the CSIRO to build a Freight Department at the Glenburnie Saleyards to reopen the line to Heywood and connect with the Melbourne to Adelaide network but is still being pursued for government standardisation. 

Due to the construction of a public space park where Mount Gambier railway station once stood in 2015, the line is no longer connected to the Millicent and Wolseley lines only with a two track easement left in its space for right of way.

Stations
Stations included the following: (from west to east):

See also
Rail transport in South Australia
Rail transport in Victoria
Pinnaroo railway line, South Australia
Pinnaroo railway line, Victoria

References

Closed railway lines in South Australia
Closed regional railway lines in Victoria (Australia)
Railway lines opened in 1917
1917 establishments in Australia
Railway lines closed in 1995
5 ft 3 in gauge railways in Australia
Limestone Coast
Transport in Barwon South West (region)